A Muse in Her Feelings is the third studio album by Canadian R&B duo dvsn. It was released on April 17, 2020 via OVO Sound. Production was handled mainly by Paul "Nineteen85" Jefferies, along with Allen Ritter, Bryan-Michael Cox, Robin Hannibal and Stevn "Stwo" Vidal among others. It features guest appearances from Buju Banton, Future, Jessie Reyez, PartyNextDoor, Popcaan, Shantel May, Snoh Aalegra, Summer Walker and Ty Dolla Sign. On July 10, 2020 a Chopped and screwed remix was released by DJ Candlestick and OG Ron C of The Chopstars. On January 15, 2021, the deluxe EP Amusing Her Feelings was released, with a guest appearance from Miguel.

Singles and promotion 
On July 10, 2019, they released two singles: "Miss Me?" and "In Between", although only the former was included on the final tracklist. On October 30, 2019, they released "No Cryin" featuring Future. They followed up this release by releasing "A Muse" and "Between Us" featuring Snoh Aalegra, the latter being a remake of the 2019 single "In Between". On April 10, 2020, they released "Dangerous City" featuring Ty Dolla Sign and Buju Banton.

On December 18, 2021, dvsn released "Blessings" as the first single from the deluxe EP Amusing Her Feelings. "Use Somebody" was released on January 8, 2021 as the second deluxe single.

Critical reception 

A Muse in Her Feelings was met with generally favorable reviews from critics. At Metacritic, which assigns a weighted average rating out of 100 to reviews from mainstream publications, this release received an average score of 78, based on five reviews.

Steven Loftin of The Line of Best Fit wrote, "From the harp-tinged starter of "No Good", far across the twinkling lights, broken hearts and epiphany, to thunderous claps of "...Again" A Muse in Her Feelings holds itself aloft, floating dreamily on a sea of feeling". Kyle Mullin of Exclaim! said, "For now, this new album stands as a kinetic encapsulation of heartache, and a strong showcase — for not only this exciting Toronto duo, but also many of their local powerhouse peers like Reyez, May and PARTYNEXTDOOR". Kyann-Sian Williams of NME praised the album saying that dvsn "have delivered a modern R&B record well worth celebrating; the duo have poured out their feelings and opened up an emotional conversation with the listener. Star-studded, shimmering, danceable and intimate, A Muse In Her Feelings is R&B in its purest form". Rawiya Kameir of Pitchfork stated, "The album's most interesting stretch is a risky three-track run that begins with the playful outro of "Outlandish", builds into the Baltimore club-referencing "Keep It Going" and crests with the lusty "'Flawless' Do It Well, Pt. 3", featuring Summer Walker in the role of an unflappable stripper. ... Even though there are songs with infinite replay value, the album doesn't quite have the depth, either". David Weaver of CLASH said, "With their modest personas and its subtle production, it could be easy to disregard dvsn's third record as more of the same, but repeat listens reveal a warm and unpretentious record, from an act confidently starting to evolve".

Track listing 

Notes
 "Miss Me?" features additional vocals by Ty Dolla $ign
 "Dangerous City" features additional vocals by Mecca Don Villan
 "Outlandish" and "Flawless (Do It Well Pt. 3)" features additional vocals by HaSizzle
 "Keep It Going" features additional vocals by HaSizzle and LOU VAL
 "Greedy" features additional vocals by James Fauntleroy

Sample Credits
 "Friends" contains elements of "Just Be Good to Me", written by James Samuel Harris III and Terry Steven Lewis, and performed by The SOS Band.
 "Still Pray for You" contains elements of "This is the Place", written by Joe Bendell, and performed by Kansas City Express.
 "No Cryin" contains samples of "Boss Ass Bitch", written by Kandise Nathan, Keyona Reed and Shontell Moore, and performed by PTAF.
 "Flawless (Do It Well Pt. 3)" contains samples of "Get It Together", written by Donell Jones, and performed by 702.
 "Between Us" contains a sample from "Nice & Slow", written by Jermaine Dupri, Usher Raymond, Brandon Casey, M.L. Seal Jr. and Brian Casey, and performed by Usher.
 "A Muse" contains a sample of "A Garden of Peace", written and performed by Lonnie Liston Smith.

Charts

References 

2020 albums
Dvsn albums
Albums produced by Nineteen85
Albums produced by Allen Ritter
Albums produced by Bryan-Michael Cox
OVO Sound albums